Diplacus leptaleus is a species of monkeyflower known by the common name slender monkeyflower.

Description
Diplacus leptaleus is a small, hairy annual herb growing at ground level or erect to a maximum height near 14 centimeters. The oppositely arranged leaves are linear or lance-shaped and up to 2.5 centimeters in length.

The tubular, wide-faced flower is under a centimeter long and may be magenta, white, or yellow in color, sometimes with dark spotting in the throat.

Distribution
Diplacus leptaleus is endemic to the Sierra Nevada of California and far western Nevada, where it grows in disturbed habitat and open, rocky slopes.

References

External links
Jepson Manual Treatment:  Mimulus leptaleus
USDA Plants Profile: Mimulus leptaleus
Mimulus leptaleus Photo gallery

leptaleus
Endemic flora of California
Flora of the Sierra Nevada (United States)
Flora of Nevada
Flora without expected TNC conservation status